The Hauk-class patrol boats were a series of Norwegian fast attack craft. Hauk means hawk in Norwegian. They were ordered in the 1970s and the first boat, Hauk, was commissioned on 17 August 1977. The ships were modernized frequently and in their later form were known as "Super-Hauks." The Royal Norwegian Navy deployed four of these warships for anti-terror patrol in the Strait of Gibraltar.

To ensure that their capability met contemporary standards the Hauk-class boats were modernized to Super-Hauk standard with the arrival of the new and more modern  MTBs. This modernization included incorporation of the Senit 8 CMS, Link 11 (receive only), modifications of the Penguin missiles and upgrades to the navigation equipment.

All the boats were decommissioned by 2008.

International operations 

The vessels were used as escort for allied vessels through the Strait of Gibraltar as part of Operation Active Endeavour. The Norwegian contribution consisted of 21 MTB Squadron and its four vessels. The squadron was stationed in Cadiz along with two Danish vessels of Flyvefisken class. The mission lasted from April to October 2003, and the vessels were widely praised for their efforts.

In November 2006, the vessels were probably once called for international duty when 22 MTB squadron became part of UNIFIL II - a maritime UN contributions in the coastal area outside Lebanon that would prevent arms smuggling in the area. The vessels were stationed in Limassol, Cyprus.

Vessels 

 Hauk (P986) - commissioned 17 August 1977
 Ørn (P987) - commissioned 19 January 1979
 Terne (P988) - commissioned 13 March 1979
 Tjeld (P989) - commissioned 25 May 1979
 Skarv (P990) - commissioned 17 July 1979
 Teist  (P991) - commissioned 11 September 1979
 Jo (P992) - commissioned 1 November 1979
 Lom (P993) - commissioned 15 January 1980
 Stegg (P994) - commissioned 18 March 1980
 Falk (P995) - commissioned 30 April 1980
 Ravn (P996) - commissioned 20 May 1980
 Gribb (P997) - commissioned July 1980
 Geir (P998) - commissioned 16 September 1980
 Erle (P999) - commissioned 10 December 1980

Gallery

See also 
 List of Royal Norwegian Navy ships

References
 Jane's Fighting Ships 2004-05, p. 516.

Patrol boat classes
Missile boats of the Royal Norwegian Navy
Patrol vessels of the Royal Norwegian Navy